State Road 429 (SR 429), also known as the Daniel Webster Western Beltway or Western Expressway south of US 441, and the Wekiva Parkway north of US 441, is a limited-access toll road built and maintained by the Central Florida Expressway Authority (CFX), the Florida's Turnpike Enterprise, and the Florida Department of Transportation (FDOT). Its mainline currently extends  from I-4 (SR 400) in Four Corners north to I-4 in Sanford. Control cities are Apopka and Tampa although the control cities for traffic at the entrances at US 441 and north are Orlando, Tampa, and Daytona Beach. SR 429 was originally planned as a western half of SR 417.

Route description

SR 429 traverses some of the highest elevations in Orange County and is often within a few miles of the Lake Wales Ridge. It runs along the west side of Greater Orlando. The road peaks at Mile Marker 13 where on clear days it is possible to see the skyline of downtown Orlando to the northeast and various portions of Walt Disney World Resort to the southeast.

Florida's Turnpike Enterprise maintains the portion of the expressway south of Seidel Road, and CFX controls the portion north of the interchange. FDOT will control the portion under construction north of SR 46.

History
The highway is named the "Daniel Webster Western Beltway" in honor of Daniel Webster, Florida's longest-serving legislator and figure often involved in state transportation issues.

Section A

Section A is the original  section from Florida's Turnpike in Ocoee, to US 441 in Apopka.  It has a toll plaza in the middle, which was the first toll plaza in the Orlando area with open road tolling for users of the E-Pass and related electronic toll collection systems. The road itself was finished in July 2000, temporarily ending at SR 50, and the four-level cloverstack interchange with Florida's Turnpike was completed in February 2001. Prior to the reconstruction of the I-4/SR 408 interchange near Downtown Orlando in 2021, this interchange featured the highest ramp in the Orlando area.

SR 429 was originally planned to continue north from its original US 441 junction, but because the land needed for the SR 429 right of way was not secured ahead of time, new housing was developed north of the former SR 429/US 441 (now SR 451/US 441) intersection. This has forced a change in plans for the extension of SR 429.

Section B
Section B, also known as the Wekiva Parkway, would connect SR 429 from US 441 to I-4 in Sanford. This  section of roadway is still currently under construction. It has been under debate for over a decade, due to its planned alignment being complicated by the ecologically fragile Wekiva River basin and shifty support from Lake County. In 2004, an agreement was reached for its completion. It will be built largely as a long causeway with a limited number of exits to better control development in the region. It is now planned to link SR 429 with SR 417, creating a continuous beltway north of Orlando; however, older plans involved a short drive on I-4 or its collector/distributor roads to reach SR 417.

On May 25, 2011, the Florida Department of Transportation and CFX announced that they have partnered to jointly explore the construction of the Wekiva Parkway extension. The proposed route will extend through Orange, Lake, and Seminole Counties and is estimated to cost $1.8 billion. Officials hope to break ground in 2012, with completion by 2021.

On January 20, 2016, the first stub section from CR 435 (Mount Plymouth Road) near Haas Road in Orange County to SR 46 east of Camp Challenge Road in Lake County opened to traffic and it is the first all-electronic toll road in Central Florida.

On July 27, 2017, the Wekiva Parkway's mainline was extended from the US 441 connector road to a new northern terminus at Kelly Park Road.

On March 31, 2018, the Wekiva Parkway's mainline was extended from Kelly Park Road to a new northern terminus at SR 46. Along with this, a  spur known as SR 453 connecting the Wekiva Parkway with SR 46 near Sorrento was opened in conjunction with the extension. This was the final section of the CFX's Section 2 of the road, and the final section of the CFX's section altogether. The final  section of the Wekiva Parkway between SR 46 and I-4 is under construction and is planned to open in 2023. This section will be constructed and maintained by FDOT.

On May 16, 2022, a  section of the Wekiva Parkway between SR 46 near Mount Plymouth to SR 46 just west of Longwood Markham Road in Seminole County opened to traffic. This was the longest section of FDOT's section of the highway to open and includes several wildlife crossing bridges.

On August 1, 2022, the northbound lanes of a  section of the Wekiva Parkway between SR 46 just west of Longwood Markham Road and SR 46 just west of Orange Boulevard in Seminole County opened to traffic, while the southbound lanes opened to traffic on August 15, 2022.

On October 21, 2022, the ramp from westbound I-4 to southbound SR 429, along with the section of the southbound lanes to SR 46 opened to traffic.

Section C
Section C is the  section from Florida's Turnpike to I-4 (SR 400) in Four Corners south of Walt Disney World.  The  section from Florida's Turnpike to CR 535 was completed in December 2002. The part from CR 535 south to New Independence Parkway opened December 16, 2005, with the extension to US 192 opening December 23. The Turnpike-maintained section, south of Seidel Road, was on a very tight construction schedule.  An extended cold snap required the contractor to push to reach the opening date, although the interchanges at Western Way and Seidel Road were not complete.  The Western Way interchange was not scheduled to open until Spring of 2006 to coincide with the opening of the new Expedition Everest ride at Disney's Animal Kingdom.  The open road tolling gantry, while located north of US 192, was let for construction with the southern five miles (8 km) and was never intended to be open to traffic in conjunction with the 2005 opening between US 92 and Seidel. The Schofield Road interchange was identified as a future interchange, meaning that on December 23 no interchanges were open between US 192 and New Independence Parkway. Other openings were April 4, 2006 for Western Way, April 12, 2006, for Seidel Road, and December 9, 2006, for the remainder from US 192 south to I-4. The Schofield Road interchange opened in May 2015.

State Road 414 Phase 2

During June 2010, construction work began on the westward extension of SR 414. Approximately  of SR 429 roadway was demolished and on May 14, 2012, a new interchange opened from SR 429 northbound to SR 414 eastbound and from SR 414 westbound to SR 429 southbound. SR 429 and SR 414 now runs concurrently to a new intersection with US 441 near Plymouth where the SR 414 designation ends. The control city is Mount Dora. The road previously signed as SR 429 north of the current SR 414 interchange has been redesignated as SR 451 and has been extended across US 441 to a new northern terminus at Vick Road.

Exit list

See also
 Central Florida Expressway Authority
 Florida State Road 453

References

External links
SR 429 (Western Beltway) – Central Florida Expressway Authority
Wekiva Parkway – Central Florida Expressway Authority
Florida @ SouthEastRoads – Florida 429

429
429
429
429
429
429
Freeways in the United States
2000 establishments in Florida